Mats Göran Olofsson (born 25 September 1945) is a Swedish curler.

From 1991 to 1995 he was a board member of the Swedish Curling Association.

Teams

Personal life
Olofsson's son is Swedish curler Nils Olofsson-Runudde, who played for Sweden in the 1998 World Junior Curling Championships.

References

External links
 
Air Canada Silver Broom 1976 World Curling Championship - Perfect Duluth Day

Living people
1945 births
Swedish male curlers
20th-century Swedish people